Urien Yrechwydd (in English: Urien of Yrechwydd) is a late Old Welsh or Middle Welsh heroic poem found uniquely in the Book of Taliesin. It is among those poems in the manuscript thought by Ifor Williams possibly to have originated as part of a sixth-century corpus of Canu Taliesin, a series of poems really composed by the semi-legendary sixth-century court poet of Rheged, Taliesin.

Location of Yrechwydd
This poem and another of the Taliesin corpus Argoed Llwyfain, characterise Urien as lord of Yrechwydd/Erechwydd, a place whose whereabouts has occasioned much debate, with implications for guessing the historical extend of the kingdom of Rheged. The Welsh word echwydd is thought to have meant 'fresh  (of  water);  fresh  water; ?cataract', suggesting that Yrechwydd was in the vicinity of fresh water. The most recent extensive studies, by Andrew Breeze, conclude that
Sir Ifor Williams thought it might be the Lake District, with plenty of fresh water (if not too much), where he is hesitantly followed by John Koch. But this makes no sense. The great area of fresh water in the Old North was that on the lower Ouse and Trent, a prodigious marsh that stretched from north of York to south of Gainsborough, sixty miles away in Lincolnshire. We can be sure that Yrechwydd was the area bordering that marsh, and hence equivalent to modern North Yorkshire, including York itself.Cf. Andrew Breeze, 'Yrechwydd and the River Ribble', Northern History, 47 (2010), 319–28, .

Text

References

Medieval Welsh literature
Taliesin